Cynoglossus feldmanni, commonly known as the River tonguesole is a species of tonguefish. It is commonly found in Thailand, Laos, Borneo, Sumatra and Cambodia. It occurs in rivers in freshwater well above the tidal zone where it lives on the bottom feeding on benthic invertebrates.

References

Cynoglossidae
Fish described in 1853